Andrés Souper de la Cruz (born 6 May 1999) is a Chilean–American professional footballer who plays for Deportes Magallanes on loan from Deportes Antofagasta.

Career

Born in the United States, Souper started his career with Chilean top flight side Universidad Católica.

For 2018, he was sent on loan to Valdivia in the second-tier Primera B de Chile.

Ahead of the 2020 season, Souper was sent on loan to top flight team Antofagasta. After the expiry of his loan deal, he signed a permanent contract with the club.

References

External links
 Andrés Souper at Soccerway

1999 births
Living people
Soccer players from New York (state)
American people of Chilean descent
Naturalized citizens of Chile
Chilean footballers
Club Deportivo Universidad Católica footballers
Deportes Valdivia footballers
Puerto Montt footballers
C.D. Antofagasta footballers
Chilean Primera División players
Primera B de Chile players
Association football midfielders
Citizens of Chile through descent
Sportspeople of Chilean descent